Göksel Arsoy (born 15 March 1936) is a Turkish actor, singer and sportsmen.

Biography
When Arsoy was studying at Istanbul University's Economics faculty. He is nephew of musician, Yesari Asım Ersoy. He started working at the nearby Yeşilköy Airport. In 1958, he made his film debut in Kara Günlerim directed by Sırrı Gültekin and went on to appear in films such as Kelepçe and Samanyolu. In many of these, he starred opposite actress Belgin Doruk. He played as actor and producer in cult film "Şafak Bekçileri” about the airforce.

He was labelled the "Golden Child" ("Altın Çocuk") of Turkish cinema by the media. Through the years, he maintained a close friendship with Ayhan Işık, his main acting rival at the time. His singing and sports career caused his to take a break from his cinema career.

Filmography

References

External links
 

1936 births
Living people
People from Kayseri
Turkish male film actors
Golden Orange Life Achievement Award winners